Come Across the River is the second album by Heather Duby, released on November 4, 2003 through Sonic Boom Recordings.

Track listing

Personnel 
Musicians
Heather Duby – vocals, keyboards, production, mixing
Steve Fisk – keyboards, engineering, production
Bo Gilliland – bass guitar, guitar, keyboards, mixing, production
Lori Goldston – cello
James W. Jr. Hampton – guitar
Jason Parker – trumpet
Production and additional personnel
Eric Akre – drums, production, engineering, mixing
Ed Brooks – mastering
Jeff Kleinsmith – design

References 

2003 albums
Albums produced by Steve Fisk
Heather Duby albums